The Island of Rockall Act 1972 (c. 2) is a British Act of Parliament formally incorporating the island of Rockall into the United Kingdom to protect it from Irish and Icelandic claims. The Act as originally passed declared that the Island of Rockall was now part of the Scottish county of Inverness-shire (it is now in the Western Isles).

The entire Act consists of a single effective section, which reads, "As from the date of the passing of this Act, the Island of Rockall (of which possession was formally taken in the name of Her Majesty on 18 September 1955 in pursuance of a Royal Warrant dated 14 September 1955 addressed to the Captain of Her Majesty's Ship Vidal) shall be incorporated into that part of the United Kingdom known as Scotland and shall form part of the District of Harris in the County of Inverness, and the law of Scotland shall apply accordingly." It was amended by the Local Government (Scotland) Act 1973 to transfer administrative control to the Western Isles Council when Inverness-shire was abolished.

References 

Constitutional laws of Scotland
History of the Outer Hebrides
Politics of Scotland
United Kingdom Acts of Parliament 1972
1972 in Scotland
Rockall